Oualid El Hasni (born 9 August 1993) is a Tunisian professional footballer who plays as a defender for Floriana.

Career
El Hasni progressed through the AS Cannes youth system before joining German club Werder Bremen's U17 team.

On 2 February 2015, El Hasni was signed by Monza in a temporary deal.

In August 2017, he joined Triestina, newly promoted to Serie C, from Étoile du Sahel.

References

External links
 
 
 Lega Serie B profile 

1993 births
Living people
Association football defenders
Tunisian footballers
Tunisia under-23 international footballers
Tunisian expatriate footballers
L.R. Vicenza players
A.C. Monza players
U.S. Triestina Calcio 1918 players
Étoile Sportive du Sahel players
FC UTA Arad players
Stade Tunisien players
Floriana F.C. players
Serie B players
Serie C players
Liga II players
Tunisian Ligue Professionnelle 1 players
Tunisian expatriate sportspeople in Germany
Expatriate footballers in Germany
Tunisian expatriate sportspeople in Italy
Expatriate footballers in Italy
Sportspeople from Cannes
Footballers from Provence-Alpes-Côte d'Azur
Tunisian expatriate sportspeople in Romania
Expatriate footballers in Romania
Expatriate footballers in Malta
French footballers
French expatriate footballers
French expatriate sportspeople in Malta
French expatriate sportspeople in Romania
French expatriate sportspeople in Germany